The Ashley and Bailey Silk Mill is an historic silk mill which is located in Marietta, Lancaster County, Pennsylvania. It was listed on the National Register of Historic Places in 1980.

It should not be confused with the Ashley and Bailey Company Silk Mill, which is located about eighteen miles west in West York, Pennsylvania.

History and architectural features
Built in 1897, this historic building is a three-story brick factory structure which was erected atop a limestone foundation. It is thirteen bays long and has a low-pitched gable roof. 

It was listed on the National Register of Historic Places in 1980. It should not be confused with the Ashley and Bailey Company Silk Mill, which was constructed in a similar style of similar material and is also listed on the NRHP. It is located about eighteen miles west in West York, Pennsylvania.

Currently, the structure is used as a condominium building.

Gallery

References

Industrial buildings and structures on the National Register of Historic Places in Pennsylvania
Industrial buildings completed in 1897
Buildings and structures in Lancaster County, Pennsylvania
Silk mills in the United States
National Register of Historic Places in Lancaster County, Pennsylvania